Bujan is a village in Kukës County, Albania.

Bujan may also refer to:
Bujan, Iran (disambiguation), several places in Iran
Another transliteration for Buyan, a mysterious island in Russian folklore
Esteban Buján,  Argentine footballer
 George Bujan, 1940s NFL footballer

See also
 Buyan (disambiguation)
 Bujang Valley